Ernest Blackmore (12 May 1895 – October 1955) was an English cricketer. He played three matches for Gloucestershire in 1925.

References

External links

1895 births
1955 deaths
Cricketers from Bristol
Gloucestershire cricketers